Thomas Walsh (8 December 1901 – 14 July 1956) was an Irish Fianna Fáil politician who served as Minister for Agriculture from 1951 to 1954. He served as a Teachta Dála (TD) for the Carlow–Kilkenny constituency from 1948 to 1956. He also served as a Senator for the Agricultural Panel from 1943 to 1944.

He was born in Gowran, County Kilkenny, one of two sons and one daughter of James Walsh, a farmer, and Catherine Walsh (née Byrne). After early education at Patrician Brothers College, Mountrath, and Rockwell College, Cashel, County Tipperary, he attended Mountbellew Agricultural College, County Galway, on scholarship. In 1921 he was among the first students enrolled in the newly opened Pallaskenry Agricultural College, Pallaskenry, County Limerick. Raids on the college by the Black and Tans aroused in him strong nationalist sentiments.

Walsh first stood for election at the 1943 general election for the Kilkenny constituency but was not successful. He was subsequently elected to Seanad Éireann as a senator for the Agricultural Panel and served until 1944. He was again an unsuccessful candidate at the 1944 general election but was elected to Dáil Éireann at the 1948 general election as a Fianna Fáil TD for the Carlow–Kilkenny constituency. 

In 1951, he joined the cabinet of Éamon de Valera as Minister for Agriculture. Walsh died suddenly in 1956 in a road traffic accident, while still a member of the Dáil. The subsequent by-election was won by the Fianna Fáil candidate Martin Medlar.

References

 

1901 births
1956 deaths
Fianna Fáil TDs
Members of the 4th Seanad
Members of the 13th Dáil
Members of the 14th Dáil
Members of the 15th Dáil
Irish farmers
People educated at Rockwell College
Ministers for Agriculture (Ireland)
Fianna Fáil senators